Cerithium guinaicum is a species of sea snail, a marine gastropod mollusk in the family Cerithiidae.

Distribution
The distribution of Cerithium guinaicum includes the North America.

Description 
The maximum recorded shell length is 45 mm.

Habitat 
Minimum recorded depth is 0 m. Maximum recorded depth is 20 m.

References

External links

Cerithiidae
Gastropods described in 1849